John Laurie Wallace (1864–1953) was an Irish-born American painter.

Wallace was born in Garvagh, Ireland. His family immigrated to the United States when he was age 4.

He studied under Thomas Eakins at the Pennsylvania Academy of the Fine Arts in Philadelphia.  He posed for several of Eakins's paintings, including The Crucifixion (1880), Arcadia (1883) and The Swimming Hole (1884–85), and for dozens of photographs. In 1881 he became Eakins's assistant.

In 1891, he moved to Omaha, Nebraska to take the position of Director of the Western Art Association.   That organization soon failed, but Wallace remained in Omaha, becoming a commissioned portrait painter and professor.  One of the portraits Wallace is known to have completed was of George W. Lininger, the owner of an extensive art collection and a private art gallery in Omaha that he routinely opened to the public at no charge.  The portrait of Lininger hung in Lininger's art gallery until it was closed and the contents sold in the late 1920s.

He died in Omaha, Nebraska  in 1953, at the age of 89, and is buried in Forest Lawn Cemetery in Omaha.

In Eakins works

References

External links

Portrait of  Professor John Laurie Wallace , 1885 at Joslyn Art Museum
Photo of J. Laurie Wallace from Durham Museum Collection

1864 births
1953 deaths
People from County Londonderry
Irish emigrants to the United States (before 1923)
Pennsylvania Academy of the Fine Arts alumni
Pennsylvania Academy of the Fine Arts faculty
Students of Thomas Eakins